General elections were held in Sark on 12 December 2012 to elect half of the 28 members of the Chief Pleas. Ten conseillers were re-elected, four candidates were elected for the first time, and two sitting conseillers lost their seats.

Electoral system
The 28 members of the Chief Pleas were elected via plurality block voting for four-year terms in two tranches. The 2012 election was held to replace members who had been elected for a four-year term in 2008.

Campaign
A total of 22 candidates contested the elections, vying for the 14 available seats.

Conduct
The Sark Government appointed Norman Browse to serve as an observer of the elections. Browse reported that the elections were "open and transparent".

Results

References

Sark
2012 in Guernsey
2012
Non-partisan elections
December 2012 events in Europe